Bidhan Chandra Majhi is an Indian politician from All India Trinamool Congress. In May 2021, he was elected as the member of the West Bengal Legislative Assembly from Nanoor (Vidhan Sabha constituency). He won the election.

References

Living people
Year of birth missing (living people)